Michael John Hastings, Lord Hastings of Scarisbrick  (born 29 January 1958)  is currently the Professor of Leadership at the Stephen R. Covey Leadership Centre at Huntsman Business School, USA, and sits on the Concordia Leadership Council. He served as Chancellor of Regent's University London from October 2016 to October 2021. He has been appointed as the current Chair of the SOAS (School of Oriental and African Studies) Board of Trustees and is an NED at Saxton Bampfylde.

He is also a Vice President at UNICEF UK and a trustee for the Africa Philanthropy Foundation. He is the former Head of Public Affairs at the BBC and was their first head of Corporate Social Responsibility serving for 12 years. He also served as the Global Head of Citizenship for KPMG for 13 years and is a former Trustee of the Vodafone Group Foundation and subsequently a Governor of the Vodafone/Safaricom M-PESA Academy in Nairobi for 800 of Kenya's most poorest children. 

Hastings began his career as a teacher then worked across government agencies on policies to build racial equality, being a Commissioner with the Commission for Racial Equality for nine years, workforce development working alongside Government on urban renewal, and safer and more effective crime prevention strategies founding Crime Concern and Catch22, having been a trustee and Chairman of Crime Concern for 21 years. He is co-founder of My Brother's Keeper – an in-depth ongoing in-prison service and support network building better outcomes for insiders. He chairs the London Chamber of Commerce and Industry's Black Business Association, and also the Advisory Board of the Black Business Institute. He served as an NED on BT's Board for Responsible and Sustainable Business for nine years. In 2021, he became President of UKCF, the UK's Community Foundations network, and separately a Freeman of the Worshipful Company of Haberdashers in the City of London.

He was appointed CBE (Commander of the British Empire) in 2003 for services to crime reduction, and appointed to the House of Lords in 2005 as an independent peer. He received the UNICEF Award in 2005 for Services to Africa's Children, and in 2014 received a Doctorate in Civil Law from the University of Kent, Canterbury, in recognition for his leadership at KPMG and the BBC and for his work in international development and corporate responsibility. In 2019, he was the inaugural recipient of the Stephen R Covey Leadership Award for a life built on principles and effective leadership in business and public life.

Early life

Family and personal life 
His father was born in Angola and educated in Somerset and Edinburgh, where he qualified as a dental surgeon. From there he went to Jamaica, where he met his wife who was one of his patients. In 1954, they moved back to the UK, where Lord Michael was born in 1958.

In 1966, the British government was funding professionals to move to Jamaica and his father took the opportunity to return and settled in Montego Bay where they built their new home. However, in 1970 a pro-Russian/pro-Cuban government was voted into power and very soon the USA with memories of the Cuban Bay of Pigs crisis created a trade blockade of the island which very soon descended into economic chaos forcing the family to return their two sons once more to the UK.

Education 
Hastings went to Scarisbrick Hall Boarding School in Lancashire. While at Scarisbrook, he was asked by his headmaster to carry out a survey of a week's television, looking out for swearing, sex, blasphemy, etc. His results were passed on to Mary Whitehouse to support her campaign to promote "better standards" on television.

Having taken his A-Levels, Hastings attended a Theological College in London but soon moved on to study teacher training at Westminster College, Oxford, before spending five years teaching at a London comprehensive school.

Journalism and business career
Hastings began his career as a teacher at Greenway Secondary school in Uxbridge (now Uxbridge High School, London), and then in 1986 moved into government service, supporting policy initiatives to bring employment and development to Britain's inner cities.

In 1990, with his specialist expertise in journalism becoming increasingly known, he was invited by the Chairman of TV-am to join as a producer of programmes looking at school failures. TV-am lost the franchise after one year but Hastings stayed on as presenter on the 6 to 7 am show. He moved to the BBC where he worked on the weekly Around Westminster programme as its presenter.

From being in front of the camera he was invited by the Director General to now go behind the camera to lobbying for the BBC's Charter Renewal and oversaw the annual fee increases. He also fought off the Murdoch empire’s desire to get all premier sports onto subscription and saw the legal provision for listed sports events such as Wimbledon and Cricket and the Olympics protected for free to air viewing. And then GMTV as chief political correspondent and then the BBC in 1994 as a presenter of the weekly Around Westminster programme, before joining the BBC Corporate Affairs Division in 1996. 

Hastings is a former trustee of the Vodafone Group Foundation and previously served for nine years on the Board for Responsible and Sustainable Business at British Telecom (BT). He first represented KPMG International on the Global Corporate Citizenship Committee of the World Economic Forum (WEF), from 2008 to 2010, and was a board director of the Global Reporting Initiative (GRI) from 2010 to 2012. In 2009 he became a member of the World Economic Forum's Global Council on Diversity and Talent; in 2010 he served on the "Global Agenda Council on the Next Generation"; and in 2011 he became a member of the World Economic Forum's Global Agenda Council on the Role of Business. From 2012 to 2014 he led the WEF Agenda Council – The Future of Civil Society, as vice chairman. Hastings is also a global advisor to the Harambe Entrepreneur Alliance.

In January 2002, Hastings was appointed a (Commander of the Order of the British Empire (CBE) in recognition of his services to crime reduction, including 15 years as chairman and 21 years as a trustee of Crime Concern. He led the merger of Crime Concern with the Rainer Foundation to create the charity Catch22. He served on the Commission for Racial Equality for nine years as a commissioner (1993–2001). He is listed as one of the 100 most influential black people in Britain and No. 6 on the 2016 list of 100 Black British Business Leaders.

Political and philanthropic career
In February 1986, Hastings received a phone call from the PM's adviser to work alongside the Government and help deal with the problems surrounding the urban riots of the time (1981/1985) arising from a sense of frustration by disenfranchised young black men. He was called to strategic meetings No10 and gave up teaching going into largely black areas to build confidence and trust among these disadvantaged communities, which he did for five years.

As someone who for a long time was always meeting and being in contact with politicians, he was first approached by Paddy Ashdown MP in his resignation honours options to consider a life peerage under Lib Dem patronage but turned down the offer. He was later offered a peerage by other senior political figures but declined once more as it was politically aligned. Eventually, however, he was approached by the Independent Appointments Commission, accepted their offer, and was elevated to the Peerage in December 2005, taking the title of his boarding school.

House of Lords
In 2005, Hastings was awarded a peerage to the House of Lords by Queen Elizabeth II, where he sits as a crossbencher. In the same year he also received the UNICEF award from the UK Chancellor for his "outstanding contribution to understanding and effecting solutions for Africa's children". Hastings is Chairman of the Council of ZANE, a development aid agency focused on Zimbabwe, and vice president of Tear Fund. In 2011, he became vice president of UNICEF, the UN Children's and Education Fund.

Hastings was chairman of Millennium Promise UK and a member of the global Millennium Promise board. In 2010, he was a leading advisor to the Chatham House enquiry into the Future Role of the UK in Foreign Affairs. He sat on the council of the Overseas Development Institute in the UK and previously on the Center for Global Development in the US.

Honours
In the 2002 New Year Honours, Hastings was awarded the CBE for services to crime reduction, after 21 years as Chairman of Crime Concern (now Catch22) and with one of his mentees, he has made a huge commitment to mentoring next generation leaders and supporting and teaching offenders in prisons in Kent and the Midlands in both group and one to one sessions.

In 2014, Hastings was conferred with a doctorate in civil law from the University of Kent, Canterbury, in recognition for his leadership at KPMG, and the BBC on International Development and Corporate Responsibility. He was installed as the Chancellor of Regent's University London in February 2017.

References

External links
 

1958 births
Living people
Academics of Regent's University London
Advisors to Chatham House
Alumni of Westminster College, Oxford
BBC people
Black British politicians
British officials of the United Nations
British Telecom people
British television executives
Commanders of the Order of the British Empire
Crossbench life peers
ITV people
KPMG people
Life peers created by Elizabeth II
People associated with the University of Kent
People's peers
UNICEF people
Hastings, Michael